Olivia Gollan (born 27 August 1973) is a former Australian racing cyclist. She won the Australian national road race title in 2003. She also competed in the women's road race at the 2004 Summer Olympics.

References

External links

1973 births
Living people
Australian female cyclists
People from Maitland, New South Wales
Cyclists from New South Wales
Olympic cyclists of Australia
Cyclists at the 2004 Summer Olympics